Schichau is a German surname, and may refer to:
 Ferdinand Schichau (1814–1896), the German businessman and engineer who founded the Schichau-Werke
 The Schichau-Werke a German engineering firm and shipyards founded by Ferdinand Schichau and based in Prussia (Elbing and Danzig), now northern Poland
 The Schichau Seebeckwerft shipyard in Bremerhaven, the West German successors to the Schichau-Werke

German-language surnames